Merate Astronomical Observatory is an old observatory in Merate (Lecco), Italy. It has housed a 1-meter Zeiss telescope since 1926.

This Zeiss di Merate is a reflecting telescope on an equatorial mount and is one of the largest telescopes funded by the Regno d'Italia ("Kingdom of Italy") before Italy became republic in 1946.

The same type of Zeiss telescope was also installed at the Hamburg-Bergedorf Observatory and the Royal Observatory of Belgium.

Gallery

See also
Asiago Astrophysical Observatory
Galileo National Telescope, 3.5m (138 inch) diameter aperture Italian National telescope.
List of astronomical observatories
List of largest optical reflecting telescopes
List of largest optical telescopes in the 20th century
Telescope mount

References

Astronomical observatories in Italy